The First Oil Well in Western Canada, also known as Lineham Discovery Well No. 1, is a defunct oil well and national historic site of Canada. Which commemorates the September 21, 1902 oil strike in what is now Waterton Lakes National Park, Alberta. The oil well originally drilled in 1902, was the first productive oil well in the Western Canadian provinces.

History

Initiators 

Timeline 
The area had been drilled unsuccessfully for oil in the early 1890s, . Lineham's well was drilled by a wood "Canadian Pole" rig powered by a  steam engine. Drilling began in November 1901 and succeeded on 21 September 1902. The well casing quickly failed, and the bore became jammed with debris and drilling tools. It was cleared in 1904, a pump was later installed. Drill tools continued to jamm the well and it was quickly abandoned. The tools remain visible in the bore.

Abandonment of well 
Production had diminished before the well was blocked. Further explorations in the area yielded nothing useful with a majority of the nearby drilling sites abandoned by 1908, but general exploration in more northerly portions of Alberta, yielded the Turner Valley field in 1914. The Oil Creek strike is believed to be the result of oil seepage along fault planes in the Lewis Overthrust, in which oil originating in younger Cretaceous rock has moved upwards through older Pre-Cambrian rock that has been forced over the oil-bearing layers. More oil in the Waterton area was eventually discovered at the Pincher Creek oil field in 1948.

A small monument, depicting a stylized drill rig, was placed over the well in 1968. The site was designated a site of national significance in 1965.

References

External links

 (Federal Historic Sites and Monuments Act Designation)

Alberta's First Oil Well

Waterton Lakes National Park
National Historic Sites in Alberta
History of the petroleum industry in Canada
Buildings and structures on the National Historic Sites of Canada register
Oil fields of Alberta